The MV Princess of the Orient was a passenger ferry owned by Sulpicio Lines that sank off Fortune Island, near the provinces of Cavite and Batangas in the island of Luzon, The Philippines on September 18, 1998. The ship was originally built in Japan as Sun Flower 11 in 1974 where she served as a cruise ferry before being sold to Sulpicio Lines in 1993.

Background
The ferry was built in 1973 by Shin Kurushima Dockyard, as one of the five ships in the Sun Flower series for Nippon Kosoku Ferry Co., Ltd. in Japan. She was named the Sun Flower 11. The ship was designed differently from the other ships of the fleet, resembling a cruise ship of its era, with two funnels and a rounded superstructure. The ship entered service on the Osaka - Kagoshima route in October 1974. Blue Highway Line acquired the ferry in November 1990, and renamed her Sun Flower Satsuma.  She measured 13,935 gross tons and was 195.7 meters long. She had a capacity of 3,995 passengers and crew.

After 19 years of service in Japan, she was retired and sold to Sulpicio Lines in 1993. A cargo ramp on the starboard bow was fitted on the ship, plus an extension of passenger decks. She became the flagship of the Sulpicio fleet due to her size and beauty. She was the largest Philippine-based passenger ferry in service until the arrival of MV Princess of the Stars in 2004. She was the only Philippine-based ferry with automatic stabilizers at the time.

In 1997 the ship was damaged after its engine room caught fire while docked at Manila North Harbor and was sent to Singapore for repairs. As a result, the stabilizers remained un-operational, and she developed a slight but noticeable list on her port side, a sign which was inconsequential until mid-1998.

Sinking
On September 18, 1998 around almost 10 PM, the Princess of the Orient sailed from Manila to Cebu City during the onslaught of typhoon Vicki.  Initially, a list of three degrees was observed at the portside, which had continuously increased. At the same, time, winds and waves were hitting the ship on its starboard side. The waves were at least seven to eight meters in height and the wind velocity was 25 knots. 

Due to large swells and excessive movement, the solid and liquid cargo below decks shifted its weight to port, contributing to the tilted position of the ship. The captain ordered a reduction in the ship's speed to 14 knots, and put ballast water in the starboard-heeling tank, hoping to stop the continuous listing of the ship. This action was in vain, as the vessel was already listing between 15 and 20 degrees to her portside.

In spite of being in a dangerous situation, the captain performed various starboard maneuvers, which added to the ship's tilting. As the ship was already inclined at an angle of 15 degrees along with the instantaneous movement of the ship, the cargo below deck completely shifted in position and weight towards portside. Two hours after leaving Manila harbor, the ferry tilted 30 to 45 degrees to its port side, making it impossible to recover. 

The ship foundered at 12:55 a.m. near Fortune Island and sank. Of the 388 passengers on board, 150 were killed. Either being trapped inside the ferry or being swept away by the waves, eventually drowning. The remaining survivors floated at sea for more than 12 hours before rescuers were able to reach them.

Wreck
The wreck remained intact since its sinking. In the early 2000s, John Bennett and Ron Loos made the first scuba dives to the wreck site. It appeared probable that the cause of the sinking was due to the cargo on the ship not being lashed properly. The rough seas from Typhoon Vicki caused the cargo of the ship to shift, causing the ship to tilt to one side, resulting in the sinking.

In 2018 and 2019, a mixed gas 5-man international rebreather team captured images of the wreck and explored it, at depths up to 128m.

See also 
 List of maritime disasters involving the Philippine Span Asia Carrier Corporation
 List of maritime disasters in the Philippines

Notes and references

External links
 Ship Awry
 Safety in the High Seas

Shipwrecks in the Pacific Ocean
Ferries of the Philippines
Maritime incidents in the Philippines
Maritime incidents in 1998
1998 in the Philippines
1974 ships